In Greek mythology, Parias (pronunciation: par-EE-is) was a son of Philomelus and a grandson of Iasion. Parias gave his name to the Parians and the city of Parion (a town in Mysia on the Hellespont).

Note

References 

 Gaius Julius Hyginus, Astronomica from The Myths of Hyginus translated and edited by Mary Grant. University of Kansas Publications in Humanistic Studies. Online version at the Topos Text Project.

Cretan characters in Greek mythology